City on Fire may refer to:

Film and TV 
 City on Fire (1979 film), a 1979 Canadian disaster film
 City on Fire (1987 film), a 1987 Hong Kong action film
 City on Fire (1993 film), a 1993 Taiwan action film
 "City on Fire" (Desperate Housewives)

Literature 
 City on Fire (Williams novel), a 1997 fantasy novel by Walter Jon Williams
 City on Fire (Hallberg novel), a 2015 novel by Garth Risk Hallberg
 City on Fire (Winslow novel), a 2022 novel by Don Winslow
 City on Fire (Dapiran book), a 2020 nonfiction book by Antony Dapiran about the 2019 Hong Kong protests

Music 
 "City on Fire", a song from the album Prophet by Swedish rock band Jerusalem.
 "A City on Fire", a 2009 song by Fightstar
 "City on Fire", a song from the musical Sweeney Todd: The Demon Barber of Fleet Street

Other 
 "Cityonfire", a asian cinema website on cityonfire.com

See also 
 City of Fire (disambiguation)